Douglas S. Cook (June 26, 1959 – July 19, 2015) was an American screenwriter best known for writing 1996's film The Rock. His other credits included Payoff, Holy Matrimony, Double Jeopardy and  Criminal. Cook wrote all of his screenplays along with his writing partner David Weisberg. They also wrote another action thriller script Blank Slate, which is currently un-produced at Bold Films.

Cook grew up in Boston and graduated from Phillips Exeter Academy and Harvard University. He moved to California to pursue a career in screenwriting.

Cook was married to Justine Jacoby Cook for 27 years. She was a former casting director and a production manager for the Marat Daukayev School of Ballet in Los Angeles. In November 2013, she died of ovarian cancer at age 53.

Cook died on July 19, 2015, at age 56 while visiting Malibu, California. He was survived by his son Mackenzie, daughter Hannah, mother Helen, brothers Brad and Peter, sister Heather, girlfriend Hannah Cox and several nieces and nephews.

Filmography 
 Payoff (1991, TV film)
 Holy Matrimony (1994)
 The Rock (1996)
 Double Jeopardy (1999)
 Criminal (2016)

References

External links 
 

1950s births
2015 deaths
American male screenwriters
Writers from Santa Monica, California
Screenwriters from California